The Vouziers-Buzancy railway was an initially  long narrow gauge and later metre gauge railway in northeastern France, which was taken into service in 1897 and operated until 1933.

History 
The line was built by the Chemins de fer départementaux des Ardennes (CA) in 1897 as a narrow gauge railway with the unusual gauge of 800 mm, until it was converted to metre gauge in 1923. It was extended to Juniville in 1906 to link it with the CA narrow-gauge Le Châtelet-Juniville line, which had already been built in 1900, and then operated until 1933.

Bridges and Stations

References 

Railway lines in Grand Est
metre gauge railways in France